Dowell or dowel may refer to:

People
 Dowell (surname)
 Dowell Loggains (born 1980), American football coach
 Dowell Myers, professor of urban planning and demography
 Dowell Philip O'Reilly (1865–1923), Australian poet, short story writer, and politician
 William Dowel (1837–1905), English-born Australian politician

Places
Dowell, Illinois, a village in the United States
Dowell, Maryland, an unincorporated community in the United States

Other uses
Dowel, a cylindrical rod, usually made from wood, plastic, or metal
Dowell Center, office building in Oklahoma City, Oklahoma
Dowell Middle School, middle school in McKinney Independent School District
Professor Dowell's Head, a science fiction novel (later filmed) by Alexander Belyayev

See also
Lones-Dowell House, historic house in Knoxville, Tennessee
McConnell Dowell, New Zealand infrastructure construction company
MacDowell (disambiguation)
McDowell (disambiguation)